David Stephen Calonne (born August 15, 1953) is an American writer and scholar of the Beat Generation and Charles Bukowski. He was born in Los Angeles, where he attended the University of California.

Impact
His work has been cited in many other distinguished works, such as Revision: History, Theory, and Practice by Alice S. Horning and Anne Becker, which discusses Calonne's investigation of how revision correlates to the psychology of creativity. His book William Saroyan: My real work is being has been influential in Michael Bobelian's book on the Armenian Genocide, Children of Armenia.

Works
The Mathematics of the Breath and the Way (editor for Charles Bukowski, City Lights, 2018) 
The Spiritual Imagination of the Beats (Cambridge University, 2017)  
Henry Miller (Reaktion Books, 2014)
Charles Bukowski (Reaktion Books, 2012)
More Notes of a Dirty Old Man (editor for Charles Bukowski, City Lights, 2011) 
William Saroyan, My Real Work is Being (1983)

References

Further reading

http://americanaejournal.hu/vol11no2/arnold
http://blues.gr/profiles/blogs/writer-and-lecturer-dr-david-s-calonne-talks-about-bukowski

1953 births
Living people
Writers from Los Angeles
Eastern Michigan University faculty
University of California, Los Angeles alumni